The 2019–20 Gonzaga Bulldogs women's basketball team represents Gonzaga University in the 2019–20 NCAA Division I women's basketball season. The Bulldogs (also informally referred to as the "Zags"), are members of the West Coast Conference. The Bulldogs, led by sixth year head coach Lisa Fortier, play their home games at the McCarthey Athletic Center on the university campus in Spokane, Washington.

Roster

Schedule

|-
!colspan=9 style=| Exhibition

|-
!colspan=9 style=| Non-conference regular season

|-
!colspan=9 style=| WCC regular season

|-
!colspan=9 style=| WCC Women's Tournament

Rankings
2019–20 NCAA Division I women's basketball rankings

^Coaches did not release a Week 2 poll.

See also
2019–20 Gonzaga Bulldogs men's basketball team

References

Gonzaga
Gonzaga Bulldogs women's basketball seasons
Gonzaga
Gonzaga